Sonny Dixon (born 1952) was a Georgia state representative and is now a news personality.

Sonny Dixon may also refer to:
 Sonny Dixon (baseball) (1924 – 2011), relief pitcher
 Sonny Dixon Interchange, an interchange of State Route 21, Jimmy DeLoach Parkway, and State Route 21 Alternate (Jimmy DeLoach Connector) in Port Wentworth, Georgia